Crawford State Park Heritage Site is a  Washington state park located  north of Metaline on the Canada–United States border in Pend Oreille County. The park preserves Gardner Cave, one of the longest natural limestone caves in the state. The cave is approximately  feet in length and has stalactites, stalagmites, rimstone pools, and flowstone. The park is open and offers cave tours on a seasonal basis.

History
The cave is named for Ed Gardner who is said to have discovered it around 1899. The park is named for William Crawford who came into possession of the property and deeded it to the state in 1921.

References

External links

Crawford State Park Heritage Site Washington State Parks and Recreation Commission 
Gardner Cave: Crawford State Park Heritage Site  Washington State Parks and Recreation Commission

Parks in Pend Oreille County, Washington
State parks of Washington (state)
Protected areas established in 1921